Bojan Trkulja (born 20 February 1982) is a Bosnian retired footballer.

Club career
He was born in Jajce, SR Bosnia and Herzegovina, back then part of SFR Yugoslavia.  In July 2002 he moved from FK Obilić playing in the First League of FR Yugoslavia to FK Glasinac Sokolac playing in the Bosnian Premier League.

He played with Kazakhstan Premier League clubs FC Atyrau and FC Kairat Almaty.

References

External links

Žepče 2003-04 squad at EUFO

1982 births
Living people
People from Jajce
Association football central defenders
Bosnia and Herzegovina footballers
Bosnia and Herzegovina youth international footballers
FK Obilić players
FK Glasinac Sokolac players
NK Žepče players
FK Rudar Ugljevik players
FC Sopron players
FK Radnički Pirot players
PFC Beroe Stara Zagora players
FC Daugava players
Manama Club players
FK Sloboda Tuzla players
FC Kairat players
FC Atyrau players
Premier League of Bosnia and Herzegovina players
Nemzeti Bajnokság I players
First Professional Football League (Bulgaria) players
Latvian Higher League players
Bahraini Premier League players
Kazakhstan Premier League players
Bosnia and Herzegovina expatriate footballers
Expatriate footballers in Serbia and Montenegro
Bosnia and Herzegovina expatriate sportspeople in Serbia and Montenegro
Expatriate footballers in Hungary
Bosnia and Herzegovina expatriate sportspeople in Hungary
Expatriate footballers in Bulgaria
Bosnia and Herzegovina expatriate sportspeople in Bulgaria
Expatriate footballers in Latvia
Bosnia and Herzegovina expatriate sportspeople in Latvia
Expatriate footballers in Bahrain
Bosnia and Herzegovina expatriate sportspeople in Bahrain
Expatriate footballers in Kazakhstan
Bosnia and Herzegovina expatriate sportspeople in Kazakhstan